Julius Goltermann should not be confused with Georg Goltermann (1824–1898), the composer of eight cello concertos.

Johann August Julius Goltermann (15 July 1825 – 4 April 1876) was a 19th-century German cellist and music professor.

Life and career
Julius Goltermann was born in Hamburg, Germany on 15 July 1825. He studied cello with Friedrich August Kummer in Dresden before holding a professorship of cello at the Prague Conservatory from 1850 to 1862 – there he taught the cellist David Popper. Between 1862 and 1870 he was a member of the court band at Stuttgart. He retired in 1870.

Death
He died in Stuttgart, Germany on 4 April 1876 aged 50.

References

1825 births
1876 deaths
Musicians from Hamburg
German classical cellists
19th-century German musicians
19th-century classical musicians